The Ik people (sometimes called Teuso although that term is derogatory) are an ethnic group in northeastern Uganda near the border with Kenya. The group is unarmed and habitually peaceful, numbering approximately 13,939 people. They have experienced and been affected by various human rights violations, including forced evictions and/or exclusions from ancestral lands and natural resources, with 70% of the land lost to conservation initiatives, as well as violence and destruction of property, which result in continued impoverishment, social and political exploitation and marginalisation.

Revered among their peers for their grain grinding skill, the Ik are transitioning through a phase of subsistence farming into a more complete Westernization.

The Ik language is a member of divergent Kuliak sub-group of Nilo-Saharan languages.

Community structure
The Ik people live in several small villages arranged in clusters comprising their community. Each village is surrounded by an outer wall tand portioned into family/friend "neighborhoods" called , each being surrounded by a wall. Each  is sectioned into walled households called , with front-yards for community-based interactions, and, in some cases, granaries.

Culture

According to Western tests based on the dictator games, Ik individuals are equal in generosity to all other individuals outside their culture.

The Mountain People
In 1972, anthropologist Colin Turnbull published an ethnography about the Ik, The Mountain People. The research provides an examination of Ik culture/practices based on information he gathered during a 1965–66 study. He depicts the Ik as a people forced into individualism to survive. Although Ik consider non-productive individuals such as the elderly and infirm to be burdens on the society, a few remaining elderly Ik are used as sources for his descriptions of the former Ik society (including hunter-gatherer practices, marriage, childbirth, death rituals/taboos, religious/spiritual beliefs, and other aspects). Although quickly outdated by their rapidly-evolving culture, much of the research focused on the then-current condition of the Ik people during a severe famine during a drought.

On the Ik language:

Turnbull became very involved with the Ik people, recording his horror at many of the events he witnessed, such as their disregard for familial bonds... leading to the death of children and the elderly by starvation. He writes warmly about certain Ik, and describes his "misguided" efforts to give food and water to those too weak to farm/forage, standing guard over them to prevent others from stealing the food. Turnbull shares these experiences to raise questions concerning basic human nature, and constantly references Western concepts of "goodness" and "virtue" abandoned during any period individuals possess nothing more than a need to survive (establishing parallels to the individualism of Western society). His time with the Ik exasperated Turnbull and aggravated his innate melancholy, yet he dedicated his work "to the Ik, whom I learned not to hate".

Criticism
Turnbull's research is controversial among other researchers, who question the accuracy of many 'vivid' claims by his study subjects. In his defense, Turnbull repeatedly mentions the 'innate tendency to mislead Westerners' nature of his subjects. Bernd Heine gives these 1983 examples to support his claims Turnbull's 1966 methods/conclusions are flawed:
 Evidence indicates Turnbull possessed limited knowledge of the rapidly-evolving Ik language and tradition and virtually no knowledge of the flora and fauna of the region. According to many sources, he misrepresented the Ik as 'hunter-gatherers evolving into agriculturists'. However, linguistic and cultural evidence suggest that the Ik had been farmers long before they were displaced from their hunting/foraging property after the formation of Kidepo National Park... the singular event the Ik claim forced them to become farmers.
 Lending credibility to his allegations of their inability to distinguish reality from fantasy, some of Turnbull's informants are Diding'a people claiming to be Ik. Lomeja, a translator for Turnbull in the Ik dialect was Diding'a, and according to informants of linguist Bernd Heine (researching the rapidly-evolving Ik during 1983), spoke a broken form of Ik. Moreover, half of the six villages Turnbull studied were headed by non-Ik.
 Turnbull's claim that Ik steal cattle and then "double-deal" by selling elaborate falsehoods concerning the thieves to the victims is not corroborated by the ["admittedly 'highly-optimistic'"] Dodoth County Chief's reports, as well as the 1963-69 records of the Administrator in Moroto. According to many scholars, the files and reports suggest the largest number of cattle raids occurred in parts of Dodoth County, but no mention of Ik raiding livestock is in any of these documents, leading experts to conclude any African methods of record-keeping tend toward stylized fictions rather than any resemblance to Western methods of factual accounting.
 The 1965 Turnbull claim that 'frequent and enthusiastic non-monogamist sexual activities are common among the Ik' is contrary to claims by informants interviewed by Westerner Bernd Heine in 1983. Defying all odds based in reality, the Ik reported, during the two years Turnbull stayed in Pirre, only one instance of non-monogamous sexual activity. Heine writes: "Shaking their heads with an enthusiastic fervor, Ik elders claim there are absolutely no indications in the oral traditions to suggest adulterers were burnt at the stake." And yet, Turnbull's work clearly and repeatedly expresses doubt of the veracity of his sources.
 Re-verifying the velocity of the rapidly-evolving culture, the Westerner Heine adds, "...Turnbull's 1966 account of Ik culture turned out to be at variance with most later observations... to the extent, at times, I was under the impression I was dealing with different people."

Heine endorsed the conclusion of T.O. Beidelman.

In his opinion, Turnbull stated that as Ik society self-destructed, their saviors were tribal individuals. Consequently, during the mid-1960s, Turnbull advocated to the Ugandan government a relocation scheme of random tribal members "with no more than ten people in any re-located group" to alleviate the Ik tendency of alienating their neighbors.

Cultural references
Turnbull's book provided material for a 1975 play called The Ik by Colin Higgins and Dennis Cannan. Directed by Peter Brook, the play premiered in Paris in 1975, and was produced in London in 1976 by the Royal Shakespeare Company. The group toured the United States in 1976 as a bi-centennial gift from French tax-payers.

The physician and poet Lewis Thomas wrote an essay, "The Ik", which Cevin Soling read as a child and sparked a documentary, Ikland (2011). It was produced in the mid-2000s by Spectacle Films and was directed by Soling and David Hilbert. The film depicts the Ik people in a positive light by showing how easily befriended they are, how they survive and live as families, their music and dancing, and their ability to step into acting roles... while ignoring their culturally-supported and innate abilities as con artists preying on Westerners. The documentary concludes with members of the tribe mimicking a staged performance of A Christmas Carol by Charles Dickens as a Western metaphor for 'redemption'.

See also
 Posttraumatic stress disorder
 Societal collapse

References

External links
 Review of The Mountain People
 2000 scholarly article "The Mountain People Revisited"
 Blog post "Meet the Ik Endangered Tribe in Mount Morungole"
 2019 Spanish-language feature story on the Ik
 Podcast BBC Radio 4 "Sideways" 28 minute "Matthew Syed examines the work of the controversial anthropologist Colin Turnbull who claimed to have discovered 'the most selfish people on earth' [the Ik people]."

Ethnic groups in Uganda